Masutatsu Yano (born July 11, 1975) is a Japanese former mixed martial artist who competed for the Ultimate Fighting Championship, RINGS, Pancrase and Deep.

Mixed martial arts career

Ultimate Fighting Championship
Yano made his professional mixed martial arts debut and sole UFC appearance against Katsuhisa Fujii on November 19, 1999 at UFC 23. He lost the fight via TKO due to punches in the second round.

Pancrase
Yano made his Pancrase debut against Daisuke Ishii on January 23, 2000 at Pancrase: Trans 1. He lost the fight via KO due to punches in the first round.

Yano then faced Kazuo Takahashi on August 27, 2000 at Pancrase: 2000 Neo-Blood Tournament Second Round. He lost the fight via unanimous decision.

Fighting Network Rings
Yano made his RINGS debut against Yasuhito Namekawa on June 15, 2001 at Rings: World Title Series 2. He lost the fight via a guillotine choke submission in the second round.

Yano then faced Hiroyuki Ito on February 15, 2002 at Rings: World Title Series Grand Final. He won the fight via majority decision thus breaking a four-fight losing streak and earning his first mixed martial arts victory.

Later career
Yano faced Masato Nishiguchi on July 21, 2003 at GCM: Demolition 030721. He won the fight via unanimous decision.

Yano made his final mixed martial arts bout against Takahiro Oba on January 22, 2004 at Deep: 13th Impact. The fight ended in a draw.

Submission grappling career
Yano competed in the 88kg category at ADCC 2001 wherein he faced Dean Lister. He lost via a rear naked choke submission.

Additionally, Yano lost to Saulo Ribeiro in the Absolute category at ADCC 2001.

Mixed martial arts record

|-
|Draw
|align=center|2-4-1
|Takahiro Oba
|Decision (majority)
|Deep: 13th Impact
|
|align=center|2
|align=center|5:00
|Tokyo, Japan
|
|-
|Win
|align=center|2-4
|Masato Nishiguchi
|Decision (unanimous)
|GCM: Demolition 030721
|
|align=center|2
|align=center|5:00
|Yokohama, Japan
|
|-
|Win
|align=center|1-4
|Hiroyuki Ito
|Decision (majority)
|Rings: World Title Series Grand Final
|
|align=center|3
|align=center|5:00
|Kanagawa, Japan
|
|-
|Loss
|align=center|0-4
|Yasuhito Namekawa
|Submission (guillotine choke)
|Rings: World Title Series 2
|
|align=center|2
|align=center|0:22
|Kanagawa, Japan
|
|-
|Loss
|align=center|0-3
|Kazuo Takahashi
|Decision (unanimous)
|Pancrase: 2000 Neo-Blood Tournament Second Round
|
|align=center|1
|align=center|10:00
|Osaka, Japan
|
|-
|Loss
|align=center|0-2
|Daisuke Ishii
|KO (punches)
|Pancrase: Trans 1
|
|align=center|1
|align=center|0:06
|Tokyo, Japan
|
|-
|Loss
|align=center|0-1
|Katsuhisa Fujii
|TKO (punches)
|UFC 23
|
|align=center|2
|align=center|3:12
|Urayasu, Chiba, Japan
|
|-

See also 
 List of male mixed martial artists

References

External links 
 

1975 births
Living people
Heavyweight mixed martial artists
Japanese male mixed martial artists
Ultimate Fighting Championship male fighters